Russagh is a civil parish in County Westmeath, Ireland.

Russagh is one of 6 civil parishes in the barony of Moygoish in the Province of Leinster.

Russagh civil parish comprises 9 townlands: Barratogher, Cappagh, Corrydonellan, Loughanstown, Loughanstown Lower aka Slievelahan, Rathowen, Russagh, Slievelahan aka Loughanstown Lower, 
Windtown North and Windtown South.

The neighbouring civil parishes are: Street to the north, Lackan (barony of Corkaree) to the east, Kilbixy to the south and Mostrim (barony of Ardagh, County Longford and Rathaspick to the west.

References

External links
Russagh civil parish at the IreAtlas Townland Data Base
Russagh civil parish at Townlands.ie
Russagh civil parish at Logainm.ie

Civil parishes of County Westmeath